The Tanchangya people or Tanchangyas are an indigenous ethnic group living in the Chittagong Hill Tracts (CHT) of Bangladesh, Indian states of Tripura and Mizoram, and Rakhine state of Myanmar.

Tanchangyas are not Chakma
No history of Tanchangya has been published on the origin, development and present of the Tanchangyas.  Only a brief history of the Tanchangyas is found in the history of the Chakma nation.  The Tanchangyas have been identified as a branch of the Chakma nation on the basis of speculative information.  The Chakmas also recognize the Tanchangyas as a branch of the Chakmas.  Even Chakma claim Tanchangya as original Chakma.  Surprisingly, there is no similarity between the Goja group of the Chakmas and the names of the twelve Goja groups of the Tanchangyas.  Historians of the Chakma Nation do not even mention the name of the Gosa group or social rituals of the Tanchangyas in their writings on the history of the Chakmas, or even the modern Chakma writers.  If Chakma and Tanchangya are recognized as belonging to the same caste.  
Hindus claim Buddhism as Hinduism or Sanatan Dharma, so they worship the Tathagata Buddha as the Hindu incarnation (tenth incarnation).  Although Hinduism and Buddhism are on two poles.  The ups and downs of the Chakma nation, the triumphs and defeats, the hopes and aspirations, the joys and sorrows, the pains and sorrows, the progress of the expedition or the equilibrium were not associated with the details of the Tanchangyas.  Only in the showcase of history are the puppets of the Tanchangas confined.

History and geographical location
The Daingnakas named Thanchangya are Buddhists and they live on the upper reaches of the river Maya (Mayu).  Their language is distorted Bengali.  The Chakmas and Dainnaks are mentioned together in history in the early fourteenth century AD.  Due to the similarity of religion and language, there is a history of closeness and friendship between the two nationalities.  The Dainaks did not have any conflict with the Arakanese.  At least there is no mention of conflict in history.  Arakan and Uchchbrahma are among the other Mongol Southeast Asian races found in ancient Arakan history.  For example, the ancient kingdom of Arakan was inhabited by the Mongols, the Tibetan Brahmo people and the Kirat tribes of Murung, Khumi, Chak, Sin, Senduz, Mro, Khang, Dinak, Marumimu, etc.

Religion 

The fact that the Dainkas are Buddhists was mentioned by Fairy, the then commissioner of Arakan Division, the author of 'History of Burma'.  With them was the Buddhist scripture Tripitaka.  The Chakmas are also Buddhists.  Although hundreds were persecuted and oppressed, they did not abandon Buddhism when they left Arakan.  Their later history testifies that they carried with them theology on the eve of leaving Arakan.  But they could not take the original Tripitaka with them because of scarcity or not having it.  From the original Tripitaka, the necessary formulas used in daily work or social occasions like death, marriage etc. are recorded.

Living 

It is said that when the Chakmas settled permanently in Chittagong, Rangunia and Rangamati, many of the people of Alikadam and Arakan moved to the area with the intention of living close to the Chakmas.  Some peoples from Alikadam settled in Naikhyangchhari, Lama and Teknaf, Ukhia etc. areas of present Cox's Bazar district.  They are still living in those places.  On the way to the north, Bandarban district Roangchhari, Ruma, Hoakakshyang, Rajbila, Shukbilas, Bangalhalia, Narangri, Kaptai valley area, Noapatang, Raingkhyang valley complete area, Hoagga, Baradam, Ghagra, Raisabili.

Cultivation
Then the farming system in the flat land has just started.  Most of the tenants were dependent on jum cultivation.  Dainnakara was also a jum farmer.  In the Zum Tauji of the Chakma Raj government, they were referred to as Taintangya (most of them come from Tainchhari in Alikadam) without mentioning Chakma or Tauji Bhuj.  The word Taintangya gradually came to be written as 'Tanchangya'.

Geographical location
Tanchangya people live in Rangamati District (Rangamati Sadar, Kaptai, Bilaichari, Rajasthali, Kawkhali, Jurachari), Bandarban (Bandarban Sadar, Rowangchari, Alikadam, Lama, Nakhyangchari), Chittagong district (Roisyabili & Sadhikyabili ), Ukhia and Teknaf (Cox's Bazar district) areas of Bangladesh. Tanchangyas also live in North-east Indian states of Assam, Tripura, Mizoram, and in Myanmar's Rakhine State as Daignet people. Most of Tanchangyas live in reserve forest areas of CHT.  On 10 April 2000, the Government of Bangladesh declared a new forest law named "Forest (Amendment) Act, 2000", a law that made it illegal to cultivate on reserve forest land. This poses problems for Tanchangyas and other indigenous communities, as they live on the cultivation of reserve forest lands.

It is difficult to form a consensus on the exact numbers of Tanchangyas. According to the 2001 census, there are 31,164 Tanchangyas in CHT. According to a report by Daily Prothom-alo the number of Tanchangya is 51,773 in CHT (Published on 3 February 2012).

Alpahabet and Language 
Tanchangyas has own Language and Alphabets.

Dress and ornaments
Traditionally, a Tanchangya woman wears colorful dresses and ornaments. The full dress of a Tanchangya woman is collectively known as "Paiet kapor", which literarily translates to "five parts." These five parts are
 (1) "Pinon", which is in seven colours with stripes
 (2) "Fadhuri", which is used as belt
 (3) "Mada-kobong" which is worn on the head
 (4) "Khadi", which is used as a scarf,
 (5) "Shaloom", which is a blouse.

Tanchangya women also wear various ornaments. These include "Rajjur & Jhanga" for the ears, "Baghor & Kuchikharu" for the wrists, "Tajjur" for the arms, "Chandrahar, Hochuli and Sikchara" for the neck. These ornaments are made mainly with silver. Tanchangya men traditionally wear loincloth and long sleeve shirts.

Musical instruments
Some of the Tanchangya musical instruments include the Bashi (flute), Kengkrong, Chobuk, and duduk.

Occupation
Agriculture is the main occupation of the Tanchangyas. Even today most Tanchangyas do jhum cultivation.  They cultivate paddy, ginger, garlic, bagurpada (e.g.coriander) etc. on hill slopes. Literacy among Tanchangyas is low. A few of them serve in government and non-government organizations. Today, Tanchangya is a developing ethnic community on the international level. Nowadays many Tanchangyas are service people and professionals such as doctors, engineers, lawyers, teachers, etc. They also are trying hard to become retail traders.

Games
Tanchangyas celebrate 'Bishu' as a main enjoyable festival on the end and beginning of the new year. "Pachon" is a special item for Bishu. "Pachon" is a mixed vegetable with dried fishes etc. Nowadays "Bishu mela" were organized in Tanchangyas localities. "Ghila kala", "Nahdeng kala", and "Gudhu kala"  are the Tanchangyas Traditional sports.

Religions
Tanchangya peoples are religiously Buddhists and observe religious rites such they worshipping Gautama Buddha and listening Buddha sermons. Tanchangyas also maintains the kathino chivar dan, Buddha Purnima, maghi purnima etc. They have at least one Buddhist viharas in their own localities.

Funeral culture
Upon the death of an individual, the body is bathed and covered with a white cloth. People pray for the departed soul in the presence of monks. The eldest son or a close relative of the deceased then shift the body to the funeral pyre. The next day, they collect the burnt bones in a pot and cover it with a piece of cloth. Then they throw the burnt bones into a river.

Inheritance
The male children of a deceased Tanchangya father divide the property equally among themselves. The daughters cannot claim any share of the property except when they have no brothers. If the deceased father has no children, an adopted son inherits all the property. If a wife is separated when she is pregnant and if she gives birth to a male child, he will inherit her ex-husband's property. If someone dies as a bachelor or without any children, his property will go to his brothers.

Notable people
 Rajguru Aggavamsa Mahathera, Bangladeshi Buddhist monk 
 Rajguru Priyo Ratana Mahathera, Bangladeshi Buddhist monk 
 Bira Kumar Tanchangya

References

External links

Ethnic groups in Bangladesh
Buddhism in Bangladesh
Buddhist communities of Bangladesh
Buddhist communities of India
Ethnic groups in Northeast India
Adivasi
Ethnic groups in South Asia